Dorian Foulon (born 2 May 1998) is a French cyclist. He represented France at the 2020 Summer Paralympics.

Career
Foulon became the first para-cyclist to compete in the able-bodied Tour de l’Avenir.

Foulon competed in the men's individual pursuit C5 event at the 2020 Summer Paralympics where he finished with a world record time of 4:18.274 and won a gold medal.

References

External links
 

Living people
1998 births
Paralympic cyclists of France
French male cyclists
Cyclists at the 2020 Summer Paralympics
Medalists at the 2020 Summer Paralympics
Paralympic gold medalists for France
Paralympic medalists in cycling
Sportspeople from Morbihan
French disabled sportspeople
Para-cyclists
Cyclists from Brittany
20th-century French people
21st-century French people